= Piazza delle Gondole =

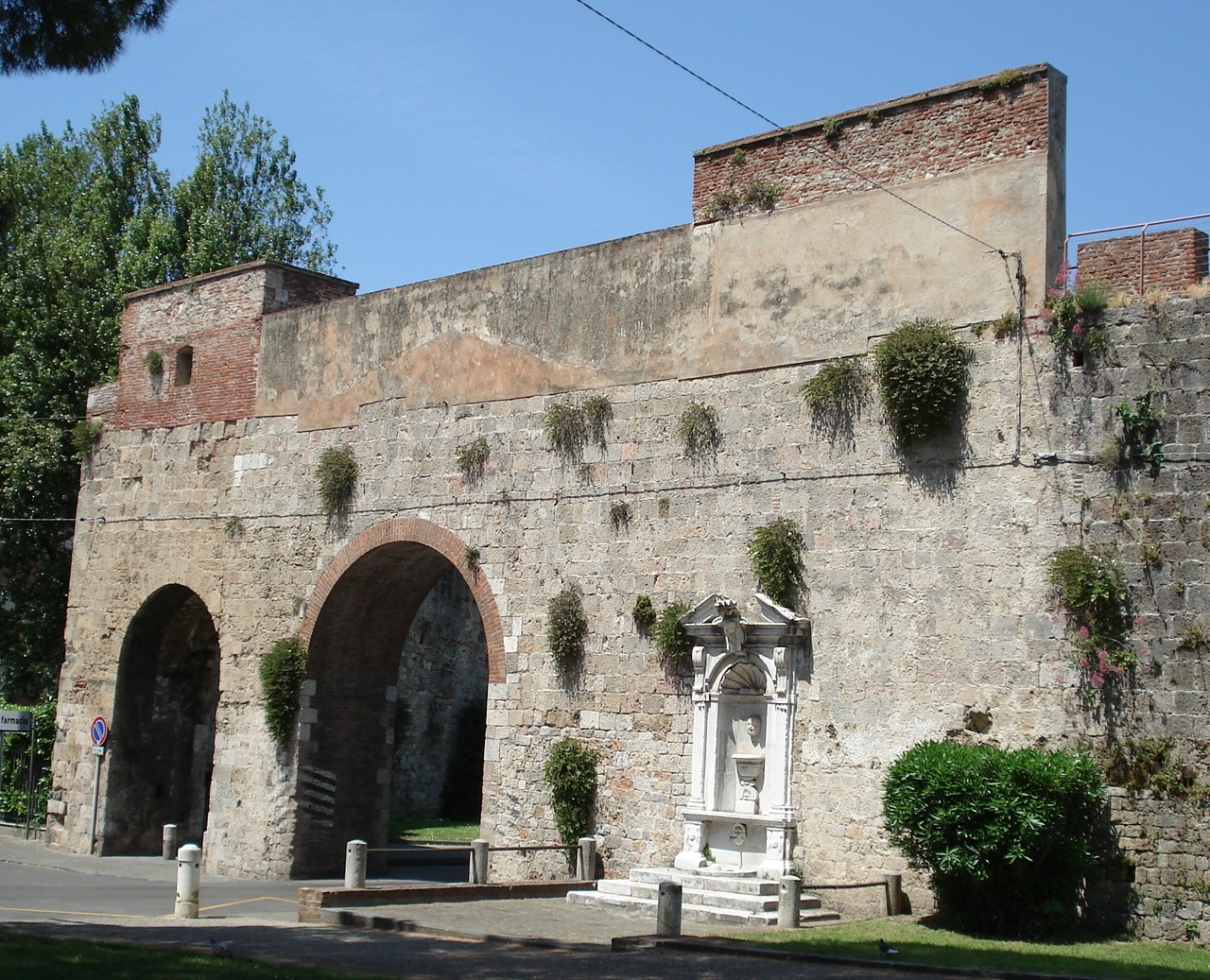
- City gate in Piazza delle Gondole

- Location within Tuscany
- Location: Pisa, Tuscany, Italy
- Coordinates: 43°43′0.42″N 10°24′33.42″E

The Piazza delle Gondole ("Square of Gondolas") is a piazza in Pisa, Italy. It is next to one of the city gates in the medieval walls. The square includes a small basin where boats used to dock.
